Emmerson Nogueira Ao Vivo is the first live album and double-album by Brazilian acoustic rock musician Emmerson Nogueira.

Track listing

Disc one

Disc two

References

Emmerson Nogueira albums
2003 live albums
Covers albums